An earthquake occurred in the northern Aegean Sea between Greece and Turkey on May 24, 2014. It had a moment magnitude of 6.9 and a maximum Mercalli intensity of VIII (Severe). Serious damage was reported on the Turkish island of Imbros and the cities of Edirne and Çanakkale, as well as on the Greek island of Lemnos. The earthquake was felt in Bulgaria and southern Romania. Several aftershocks followed the main shock, the strongest measuring 5.3 ML. This aftershock struck the Gulf of Saros at 12:31 local time.

Tectonic setting 
The northern part of the Aegean Sea shows a transition from the strike-slip tectonics associated with the North Anatolian Fault (NAF) to the extensional tectonics that characterise the area north of the Hellenic arc. The location of this earthquake is on the westward continuation of the NAF on the boundary between the Anatolian Plate and the Eurasian Plate. Other earthquakes on this part of the NAF include an M6.6 event in 1975 and an M5.7 event in 2003.

Earthquake 
The distribution of aftershocks, combined with the observed focal mechanism, indicate dextral (right lateral) strike-slip on a WSW-ENE striking fault, assumed to be a continuation of the NAF. Analysis by backprojection of strong motion waveforms has been used to understand the detailed propagation history of the earthquake rupture. Two separate fault segments have been identified using this method. The shorter segment to the west of the hypocenter ruptured first followed by rupture to the east along the 65 km segment. Propagation of the longer eastern segment occurred at speeds well in excess of the S-wave velocity, making this an example of a supershear earthquake.

Damage and casualties 

A British tourist was injured in Lemnos, Greece. A shelter at the Lemnos International Airport collapsed. Many abandoned houses and a church were also damaged. Almost three hundred houses were damaged in Turkey and 11 houses collapsed in Greece.

Doğan News Agency said the tremor caused damage to some old houses on the island of Imbros, off Turkey's northern Aegean coast, and 30 people were taken to a hospital with minor injuries. Early reports talked about a heart attack in the greater earthquake area, but the death has not been confirmed. The Governor of Çanakkale reported a total number of 324 injuries, and three deaths. Two churches and 13 mosques were damaged to various extents. Minor damage was also inflicted in Bulgaria.

See also
 List of earthquakes in 2014
 List of earthquakes in Bulgaria
 List of earthquakes in Greece
 List of earthquakes in Turkey
 2017 Aegean Sea earthquake
 2020 Aegean Sea earthquake

References

External links
 M6.9 Aegean Sea Earthquake of 24 May 2014 – United States Geological Survey
 

2014 earthquakes
2014 in Greece
2014 in Turkey
Earthquakes in Turkey
Earthquakes in Greece
Earthquakes in Bulgaria
History of the Aegean Sea
May 2014 events in Europe
Supershear earthquakes
Earthquakes in Romania
2014 disasters in Turkey
2014 disasters in Europe
2014 disasters in Greece
2014 disasters in Bulgaria